The  is an award presented annually in Japan since 1958 by the . It is awarded for railway vehicles that entered service in the previous year and were voted by members as being the most outstanding design of the year.

Award winners

The list of award winners since 1958 is as follows.

See also

 List of motor vehicle awards
 Laurel Prize

References

External links

  
 The Blue Ribbon & Laurel Prize: Japan's Best New Trains, Japan Railway Journal on NHK World-Japan

Awards established in 1958
Railway culture in Japan
Commercial vehicle awards
Japanese awards
1958 establishments in Japan
Rail transport industry awards